Andrew Chin, better known by the stage name Brushy One String, is a Jamaican singer and bassist. He performs with a guitar that only has one string. A video of him performing his hit song "Chicken In The Corn" was uploaded to YouTube in 2013; as of March 2023, it had been viewed 59 million times.

Early life 
Andrew Chin is the son of Jamaican reggae singer Freddie McKay. According to Chin, the idea of playing a guitar with a single string "came to him in a dream."

Career 
In performances Chin plays an acoustic guitar with only one string, using the body of the guitar as percussion.

Luciano Blotta, who met Chin while in Jamaica shooting his 2007 documentary Rise Up, used his song "Chicken in the Corn" in the soundtrack of the movie. He later played at music festivals such as South by Southwest, New Orleans House of Blues, and New Orleans Jazz & Heritage Festival.

In 2014, The King of One String, a documentary about his musical career, was released.

In 2019, Chin worked with actor-comedians Lauren Lapkus, Paul F. Tompkins and Scott Aukerman on their podcast Threedom. The podcast promoted Brushy's Kickstarter to create a new studio album, which was fully funded.

Discography 
Studio albums
Destiny (2013)
No Man Stop Me (2016)
All You Need Is One (2019)

Live albums
Live at New Orleans Jazz & Heritage Festival (2015)

Compilations
The King of One String – Acoustic (2010)

Filmography 
Rise Up (2007)
The King of One String (2014)
The Psychiatrist (2021)

References

External links 
 Official website

Jamaican guitarists
21st-century Jamaican male singers
Musicians from Kingston, Jamaica
Living people
Year of birth missing (living people)